Asphondylia websteri, the alfalfa gall midge, is a species of gall midges in the family Cecidomyiidae.

References

Further reading

External links

 

Cecidomyiinae
Insects described in 1917

Diptera of North America
Taxa named by Ephraim Porter Felt
Gall-inducing insects